Bill Yidumduma Harney is an elder of the Wardaman people, known as an artist, storyteller, and musician. As of 2022, he lives at Menngen Station, near Katherine in the Northern Territory of Australia, which lies in the traditional lands of the Wardaman people.

Early life
Harney was born in 1931 at Brandy Bottle Creek, on Willeroo Station, NT. His biological father was the Irish-Australian writer William Edward Harney, but he was brought up in a traditional Aboriginal community by his adoptive Aboriginal father, Joe Jomornji, and mother, Ludi Yibuluyma. His sister was taken as part of the Stolen Generations, but he escaped because his mother covered him in charcoal to hide the whiteness of his skin.

Aboriginal teachings and awards
Harney is well known as an advocate and ambassador for Aboriginal Australians, and has made several international tours promoting knowledge of Aboriginal Australians. He also appears regularly on TV, radio, and film, often speaking on the subject of Aboriginal astronomy. In 2003 he published, with Hugh Cairns, Dark Sparklers, detailing the astronomy embedded in the Wardaman culture. He has been a finalist several times in the National Aboriginal & Torres Strait Islander Art Award. In August 2009 he featured in a two-man The First Astronomers show with astrophysicist Ray Norris at the Darwin Festival, and in November 2009 he was prominent in the Message Stick episode on Aboriginal astronomy produced by ABC TV.

In 2020, the International Astronomical Union's Working Group for Small Body Nomenclature formally approved the asteroid 1979 MR2 as 7630 Yidumduma in honour of his sharing and promotion of traditional Wardaman astronomical knowledge through film, television, and books, including Dark Sparkers and Four Circles.

Selected bibliography
1999 - Born Under the Paperbark Tree (with Jan Wositzky) 
2003 – Dark Sparklers (with Hugh Cairns)

References

External links
Bill Harney Biography on ridji-didj
Artist's profile at Mimi Arts
Biography on Royal Institution Australia Web page

1931 births
Living people
Australian Aboriginal artists
20th-century Australian non-fiction writers
20th-century Australian painters
Indigenous Australian musicians
20th-century Australian musicians
20th-century Australian male musicians
21st-century Australian non-fiction writers
21st-century Australian painters
21st-century Australian musicians
21st-century Australian male musicians
Australian male non-fiction writers
20th-century Australian male writers
21st-century Australian male writers
Writers from the Northern Territory
Artists from the Northern Territory
Musicians from the Northern Territory
20th-century male artists
21st-century male artists
Australian Aboriginal elders